The Grand Duchy of Karameikos (product code GAZ1) is an accessory for the Basic Set edition for the Dungeons & Dragons fantasy role-playing game. The book was written by Aaron Allston, and was published in 1987. Cover art is by Clyde Caldwell, with interior illustrations by Stephen Fabian.

Contents
The Grand Duchy of Karameikos is a sourcebook that details the feudal nation of Karameikos. The Grand Duchy of Karameikos includes a collection of non-player characters.

This 64-page booklet describes the realm of Karameikos within the D&D world.  After the introduction, the book is divided into two sections, the Gazetteer section, and the Adventure section. The Gazetteer describes some background information for the players, and details the history, politics, society, economy, and communities of Karameikos, as well as some characters and monsters that may be encountered there. The Adventure section features adventures characters appropriate to the Basic, Expert, Companion, and Master levels.

Publication history
GAZ1 The Grand Duchy of Karameikos was written by Aaron Allston, with a cover by Clyde Caldwell and interior illustrations by Stephen Fabian, and was published by TSR in 1987 as a 64-page booklet with a large color map and an outer folder.

Reception

References

Dungeons & Dragons Gazetteers
Mystara
Role-playing game supplements introduced in 1987